"Clarity" is a song by Australian singer-songwriter Vance Joy, released on 8 April 2022 through Liberation Music as the third single from Joy's third studio album, In Our Own Sweet Time. 

According to a press release, Joy wrote it over Zoom with Joel Little shortly after a Halloween party.

At the 2022 ARIA Music Awards, the song was nominated for Best Pop Release and Song of the Year.

At the APRA Music Awards of 2023, the song was shortlisted for Song of the Year.

Reception
Ellie Robinson from NME said "The new track adds a world of depth to the folky indie-pop slant of Joy's earlier material, supplementing his cool and cruisy acoustic strumming with deep bass grooves, crisp and low-key, yet duly impactful drums and a soaring horn section."

Charts

Weekly charts

Year-end charts

Certifications

References

2022 singles
2022 songs
Vance Joy songs
Song recordings produced by Joel Little
Songs written by Vance Joy
Songs written by Joel Little